Rhinophyllis is a genus of moths belonging to the family Tineidae.

Species
Rhinophyllis dasychiras Meyrick, 1936 (from Bengal)

References

Tineidae
Tineidae genera